Dodsworth is a satirical novel by American writer Sinclair Lewis, first published by Harcourt Brace & Company on March 14, 1929. Its subject, the differences between US and European intellect, manners, and morals, is one that frequently appears in the works of Henry James.

Plot summary
The novel is set in the period between late 1925 and late 1927.  Samuel ('Sam') Dodsworth is an ambitious and innovative automobile designer, who builds his fortunes in fictional Zenith, Winnemac. In addition to his success in the business world, he had also succeeded as a young man in winning the hand of Frances 'Fran' Voelker, a beautiful young socialite. While the novel provides the courtship as a backstory, the real story begins upon his retirement. Retiring at the age of fifty as a result of his selling of his successful automobile company (The Revelation Motor Company) to a far larger competitor, he sets out to do what he had always wanted to experience: a leisurely trip to Europe with his wife, with aspirations to visit some manufacturing plants looking for his next challenge. His forty-one-year-old wife, however, motivated by her own vanity and fear of lost youth, is dissatisfied with married life and small town Zenith, and wants to live in Europe permanently as an expatriate, not just visit for a few months. Passing up advancement in his recently sold company, Dodsworth leaves for Europe with Fran. Her motivations upon visiting Europe become quickly known.

In their extensive travels across Europe, they are soon caught up in vastly different lifestyles. Fran falls in with a crowd of frivolous socialites, while Sam plays more of an independent tourist. 'With his red Baedeker guide book in hand, he visits such well-known tourist attractions as Westminster Abbey, Notre Dame Cathedral, Sanssouci Palace, and the Piazza San Marco. But the historic sites that he sees prove to be far less significant than the American expatriates that he meets on his extensive journeys across Great Britain and continental Europe'  He meets Edith Cortright, an expatriate American widow in Venice, who is everything his wife is not: self-assured, self-confident, unselfish and able to take care of herself. As Sam and Fran follow their own pursuits, their marriage is strained to the breaking point. Both are forced to choose between marriage and the new lifestyles they have pursued.

The novel includes detailed descriptions of Sam and Fran's tours across Europe. In the beginning, they leave their mid-Western hometown of Zenith, board a steam liner in New York and cross the Atlantic Ocean. Their first stop is England. They visit the sights in London and are invited by Major Clyde Lockert to join a weekend trip to the countryside. Later, after Lockert has made an indecent proposal to Fran, they depart for Paris, where she soon engages in a busy social life and he takes up sightseeing. When Sam decides to go back to America for his college reunion in New Haven, Fran spends the summer months on the lakes near Montreux and Stresa, where she has a romance with Arnold Israel. Once Sam has picked her up in Paris, they agree to continue their travels together, touring France, Italy, Spain, Austria, Hungary and Germany. Their marriage comes to an end when she falls in love with Kurt von Obersdorf in Berlin. Whereas she stays on with her new love, he criss-crosses Europe in an attempt to cope with his new situation. When Sam happens to run into Edith in Venice, she persuades him to accompany her on a visit to a village in the vicinity of Naples. Fran's fiancé calls off the marriage, and 
Sam joins his former wife on her voyage back to New York. Three days later, he is back on the next ship to meet Edith in Paris.

Adaptations
The novel was adapted for the stage in 1934 by Sidney Howard and filmed by producer Samuel Goldwyn in 1936 and directed by William Wyler. It starred Walter Huston, Ruth Chatterton and Mary Astor. A 1995 musical adaptation that was staged in Fort Worth, Texas with Hal Linden and Dee Hoty.

Analysis
In his analysis of the novel, Martin R. Ausmus has described Dodsworth as Lewis' "most sympathetic yet most savage", "most real" and "truest picture of the middle class" of America at the time.  Michael Augspurger has noted the influence of the ideas of Thorstein Veblen in his analysis of the presence of ideas and ideology related to business in the novel.

References

External links
 

1929 American novels
American novels adapted into films
American satirical novels
Harcourt (publisher) books
Novels set in the Midwestern United States
American novels adapted into plays
Novels by Sinclair Lewis
Novels set in Europe